Chionanthus retusus, the Chinese fringetree, is a flowering plant in the family Oleaceae. It is native to eastern Asia: eastern and central China, Japan, Korea and Taiwan.

It is cultivated in Europe and North America as an ornamental tree, valued for its feathery white flowerheads.

In Japan's Aichi Prefecture near Inuyama there is a grove of seven mature Chionanthus retusus renowned for their yearly white blooms. They were designated by the authorities as a natural monument since 1923.

Gallery

References

retusus
Ornamental trees
Trees of China
Trees of Japan
Trees of Korea
Trees of Taiwan
Plants described in 1852